Kelly Lynn Klump is an American clinical psychologist and MSU Foundation Endowed Professor in the Department of Psychology at Michigan State University, known for her research on the genetics of eating disorders. She is also the co-director (with S. Alexandra Burt) of the Michigan State University Twin Registry.

References

External links
Faculty page

American women psychologists
Living people
University of Minnesota alumni
Michigan State University faculty
Psychiatric geneticists
Year of birth missing (living people)
American women academics
21st-century American women
American clinical psychologists